is a Japanese film producer.  He is best known for collaborating as a producer for films made by actor and filmmaker Takeshi Kitano under Kitano's production company, Office Kitano.

Career
Mori graduated from Aoyama Gakuin University in 1976. He joined Super Produce Inc., a Japanese TV production company, directing several TV programs for Takeshi Kitano. In 1988, Mori became a key member in the establishment of Kitano's production company Office Kitano.  Mori continues to produce films under the Office Kitano production banner.

References

External links
Official site of the Office Kitano 

Japanese film producers
1953 births
Living people
Aoyama Gakuin University alumni